WisconsinEye is a non-profit, private public affairs cable network in the state of Wisconsin, United States.  The network airs gavel-to-gavel coverage of the Wisconsin Legislature, including floor sessions of the Wisconsin State Assembly and Wisconsin State Senate, plus committee meetings and other programs of state interest such as panels, town halls, and programs about state history. The coverage is available live both on the cable network as well as through the WisconsinEye website.

The channel has partnered with Charter's Spectrum (made up of the legacy Time Warner and Charter systems within the state) in order to reach over 60 percent of the state's population, and is available on the lifeline tier for all viewers. The channel began operations in May 2007, and although the network's signal is 480i standard definition, all programming is acquired in 1080p with high-definition television (HD) cameras and equipment and presented in letterboxed format, suggesting a simple transition to an HD signal should the opportunity arise; the air feed on the network's website broadcasts in its native format (notably, the network is unavailable to Spectrum customers through that provider's mobile app). In the summer of 2019, the channel was converted to a forced widescreen mode, filling a 16:9 screen, albeit still in standard definition on cable.

Like most state public affairs networks and C-SPAN, WisconsinEye has a strict license regarding use of state legislature and other network footage in any way other than for reference purposes and disallows it from being used in political advertising, an issue which came to the forefront with a Green Bay-targeted ad by a Planned Parenthood political action committee using the network's footage in September 2013.

The channel was removed from Time Warner at the end of the original carriage agreement in early 2009 due to the network wanting payment for carriage, but eventually returned to that provider's systems in late March 2012. Time Warner and Charter merged in May 2016, making Charter's merged "Spectrum" service the dominant carrier of the network through the state.

The non-profit is financed by private donors from all sectors and political persuasions, including the Lynde & Harry Bradley Foundation, the Argosy Foundation, The Capital Times/Evjue Foundation, Phil Hendrickson, Terry and Mary Kohler, Madison Gas and Electric, Kwik Trip, Acuity Insurance, the Helen Bader Foundation, 5Nines Technology, Yahara Software, and Wisconsin billionaires Ken and Diane Hendricks, who have contributed more than US$1 million.

References

External links
WisconsinEye
Wisconsin State Assembly
Wisconsin State Senate

Wisconsin Legislature
Legislature broadcasters in the United States
Television networks in the United States
Commercial-free television networks
Television channels and stations established in 2007
Television stations in Wisconsin
Television stations in Madison, Wisconsin